HMS York was a 74-gun third-rate ship of the line of the Royal Navy, built at Rotherhithe by the contract firm Samuel & Daniel Brent, and launched on 7 July 1807. She saw service during the Napoleonic Wars, though is best known for her time spent as a prison ship. She was broken up in March 1854.

Service history
HMS York was one of many British warships ordered after they were most needed. Although the major naval battles of the Napoleonic Wars had already occurred by the time of her launching, York was employed on some notable campaigns.

After her launch, York was under the command of Captain Robert Barton, and as part of Sir Samuel Hood's squadron, she participated in the occupation of Madeira.

In 1809, York was on the West India Station, and was involved in the capture of Martinique. In April a strong French squadron arrived at the Îles des Saintes, south of Guadeloupe. York was among the naval vessels that shared in the proceeds of the capture of the islands.

In July–August 1809 York was involved in the disastrous landings at Walcheren. York was later with the Mediterranean Squadron off Toulon.

On 17 December 1813 York captured Marie Antoinette.

Fate
In 1819, York entered Portsmouth harbour, where she was stripped of her masts and guns, and converted into a prison ship. HMS York is best remembered in this state, thanks to a contemporary drawing by Edward William Cooke, which shows her fully converted, and with laundry above her decks where sails once would have been. She would have typically contained approximately 500 convicts.

After many years at this harbour service, she was finally broken up in March 1854.

Notes, citations, and references
Notes

Citations

References

Prison ship York at Portsmouth Harbour. PortCities London. Retrieved 6 November 2008.
Andie Byrne, "HMS York, built in 1807 at Nelson Dock in Rotherhithe", 18 August 2013, A Rotherhithe Blog. Retrieved 29 November 2014.
Michael Phillips. York (74) (1807). Michael Phillips' Ships of the Old Navy. Retrieved 6 November 2008.
Lavery, Brian (2003) The Ship of the Line - Volume 1: The development of the battlefleet 1650-1850. Conway Maritime Press. .

Victorian-era ships of the line of the United Kingdom
Ships of the line of the Royal Navy
Fame-class ships of the line
Ships built in Rotherhithe
1807 ships
Prison ships